Calling All Cars is a 1954 short film directed by Maclean Rogers, starring Cardew Robinson and John Fitzgerald.  The film also features Spike Milligan voicing the thoughts of "Freddie", an old taxicab featured in the film. Something of a curiosity, the film is a strange mixture of semi-documentary about the port of Dover and a comedy about two young men (Robinson and Fitzgerald) who decide to chat up two girls and follow them to Dover in an old cab.
The former 'Fantail' restaurant building, where the two principal actresses stop for tea, en route to Dover, still stands in Locksbottom, Kent.

Cast
 Spike Milligan as Freddie, The Taxi (voice)
 Cardew Robinson as Reggie Ramsbottom
 John Fitzgerald as Tom Lester
 Adrienne Scott as Beryl Grant
 Pauline Olsen as Marjorie Grant
 Margot Bryant as Mrs. Flit
 Gloria Brett as Mavis Grant

External links
 
 

1954 films
Films directed by Maclean Rogers
British comedy films
1954 comedy films
British black-and-white films
1950s English-language films
1950s British films